The Star is a weekly current affairs magazine published as a supplement to The Daily Star, Bangladesh's largest circulated English newspaper. The magazine is increasingly seen to promote liberal, progressive and secular values in the country, keeping line with the ideals of the Bangladesh Liberation War. Aasha Mehreen Amin serves as editor of the magazine and Ahmede Hussain is its assistant editor.

External links
 http://www.thedailystar.net/the-star

News magazines published in Asia
Magazines published in Bangladesh
English-language magazines
Magazines with year of establishment missing
Newspaper supplements
Weekly magazines
Mass media in Dhaka